Katie Sutherland may refer to:

Katie Sutherland, musician in Pearl and the Puppets
Katie Sutherland (The Inbetweeners), a fictional character